Fort Henry is a Grade II listed World War Two observation bunker overlooking Studland Bay, in Dorset. It was built in 1943 to defend the bay from possible German invasion along with other beach defences such as gun emplacements, Type 25 pill boxes and concrete Dragon’s Teeth anti-tank obstacles (which have also been listed for protection).

Its name derives from the home base in Ontario of the Canadian Royal Engineers who built it.

Today, it is owned by the National Trust and forms part of the Studland Beach Second World War walk.

An English Heritage spokesman commented following the bunker's listing on 20 November 2012:

D-Day preparations
On 18 April 1944, six weeks before D-Day (6 June 1944), Winston Churchill, the British prime minister, was joined by King George VI, Supreme Allied commander Dwight D. Eisenhower, Field Marshal Bernard Montgomery and Acting Admiral Louis Mountbatten at the observation point to witness the largest live ammunition practice of the entire war.

Operation Smash
On 4 April 1944, Operation Smash was held at Studland Bay with the Duplex Drive Valentine tanks. A trial run of the tanks ran into difficulty when a change in the weather adversely affected the sea conditions. Six stricken tanks sank with the loss of six crew members. 
The lesson learned from this trial was the tanks would not survive being launched too far from the beach and consequently on D-Day itself the tanks were released in shallow water.

The remains of the tanks were protected as a scheduled monument in 2019.

See also
British hardened field defences of World War II

References

Bunkers in the United Kingdom
World War II sites in England
Grade II listed buildings in Dorset
Military history of Dorset